Arotrophora ochraceellus is a species of moth of the family Tortricidae. It is found in Australia, where it has been recorded from New South Wales and Victoria.

The wingspan is about 28 mm for males and 32 mm for females.

References

Moths described in 1863
Arotrophora
Moths of Australia